The 1995–96 season was the 99th season of competitive football in Scotland.

Scottish Premier Division

Summary
Rangers won the Premier Division with a record 87 points, finishing four ahead of rivals Celtic. Aberdeen were third with 55 points (on goal difference).

Falkirk were relegated after finishing bottom. Partick Thistle were relegated via the play-offs, losing 3–2 on aggregate to Dundee United, who returned to the Premier Division at the first attempt. This was the only occasion on which this short-lived play-off system relegated a team from the Premier Division.

Rangers qualified for the European Cup, with Celtic and Aberdeen making it into the UEFA Cup. All three clubs entered at the qualifying round stage.

Celtic's Pierre van Hooijdonk was the top scorer with 26 goals, ahead of the Rangers trio of Gordon Durie (17), Ally McCoist (16) and Paul Gascoigne (14).

Rangers recorded the biggest win of the campaign with a 7–0 home win over Hibernian, with Gordon Durie scoring four times. Incredibly, Hibs had won 1–0 at Ibrox just three months earlier, and Hearts won 3–0 there just three weeks after the 7–0 match.

Celtic went 31 games unbeaten, from 4 October to the end of the season. Motherwell had the best winning run with five consecutive successes, while Falkirk lost eight in a row.

Meadowbank Thistle, who had been relegated from the Second Division, were renamed Livingston to reflect their relocation from Edinburgh to Livingston for this season. The renamed club ended the season as Third Division champions.

Table

Champions: Rangers
Relegated: Partick Thistle, Falkirk

Scottish League Division One

Promoted: Dunfermline Athletic, Dundee United
Relegated: Hamilton Academical, Dumbarton

Scottish League Division Two

Promoted: Stirling Albion, East Fife
Relegated: Forfar Athletic, Montrose

Scottish League Division Three

Promoted: Livingston, Brechin City

Other honours

Cup honours
Rangers won the Scottish Cup, beating Hearts 5–1 in the final, with Gordon Durie scoring a second half hat-trick.

The Coca-Cola Cup went to Aberdeen, who beat Dundee 2–0 to win the trophy for the sixth time.

The Challenge Cup was won by Stenhousemuir, who beat Dundee United on penalties after a 0–0 draw. United never conceded a goal in the competition.

Individual honours

SPFA awards

SFWA awards

Scottish clubs in Europe

Average coefficient - 3.500

Scotland national team

Scotland recorded home wins over Greece, Finland and San Marino between August and November in the European Championship qualifiers to secure qualification, keeping a clean sheet in each match. The final three friendly matches before Euro 96 were lost, including two just two weeks before the first match.

In the competition, Scotland battled to a 0–0 draw in the opener against the Netherlands at Villa Park. They were then beaten 2–0 at Wembley by hosts England in the second group match. During this match Gary McAllister had a penalty kick saved by David Seaman when the score was 1–0 to England. Moments later, Paul Gascoigne scored one of the great Wembley goals to make the score 2–0 and effectively win the match.

Going into the final match at Villa Park, Scotland had to beat Switzerland and hope that England beat the Netherlands, while also needing a five-goal swing in their favour. A goal by Ally McCoist put Scotland on their way to a 1–0 victory and with England leading 4–0 against the Dutch, Scotland were going through. But Patrick Kluivert scored a 78th-minute goal against England, which was enough to send Craig Brown's squad out of the tournament on goals scored (goal difference was tied).

Key:
(H) = Home match
(A) = Away match
ECQ8 = European Championship qualifying - Group 8
ECGA = European Championship - Group A

Notes and references

 
Seasons in Scottish football